Dimitri Sergeevich Rozhdestvensky (7 April 1876 St Petersburg  – 25 June 1940, Leningrad) was a Russian physicist. He worked on spectroscopy, examining the dispersion of sodium lines. He drew up a proposal for the State Optical Institute which was established in 1918 in Petrograd.

Rozhdestvensky graduated in 1894 and went to study at St. Petersburg. He worked in Giessen with Paul Drude from 1901 to 1903 before returning to St Petersburg. He was involved in establishing optics research. He received a Mendeleev Medal in 1912. He became a professor of physics in 1916.  He developed establish theories to explain atomic spectra. He is buried amongst the among the Literatorskie Mostki at the Volkovo Cemetery.

References

1876 births
1940 deaths
Physicists from the Russian Empire
Soviet physicists